Werner Emmanuel Bachmann (November 13, 1901 – March 22, 1951) was an  American chemist. Bachmann was born in Detroit, Michigan where he studied chemistry and chemical engineering at Wayne State University and later at the University of Michigan in Ann Arbor nearby. He completed his doctorate under Moses Gomberg and spent the rest of his academic career at the University of Michigan.

Bachmann studied physical organic chemistry (rearrangements, free radicals) and organic synthesis. He is considered a pioneer in steroid synthesis, and carried out the first total synthesis of a steroidal hormone, equilenin with Alfred L. Wilds. His name is associated with the Gomberg-Bachmann reaction for the synthesis of diaryl compounds from aryl diazonium chlorides.

Bachmann developed a new method for the production of the explosive RDX, which was used by the United States during World War II.

References

Michigan State University Bachmann Biography
Gomberg-Bachmann reaction

External links
National Academy of Sciences Biographical Memoir

1901 births
1951 deaths
American biochemists
University of Michigan alumni
University of Michigan faculty
Scientists from Detroit
Wayne State University alumni